International Contact Groups are "informal, non-permanent international bodies that are created ad hoc, with the purpose of coordinating international actors in their aim of managing a peace and security crisis in a specific state or region (single-issue). They are founded and formed out of by states and/or International Organizations/Regional Organizations. They do not have own administrative structures, but are official announced and meet periodically." Since 1977, at least 27 ICGs  have been formed.

Examples of such groups include:
 Western Contact Group, Namibia, 1977
 Contact Group (Balkans) (1994)
 International Contact Group (Basque politics)
 International Contact Group on Liberia (1996)
 International Contact Group for Libya (2015)
 International Contact Group on the Mano River Basin (2002)
 Contact Group on Piracy off the Coast of Somalia (since 2008)
 Friends of Syria Group, an International Contact group for Syria (London 11)
 International Somalia Contact Group (since 1998)
 International Contact Group, part of the Framework Agreement on the Bangsamoro for the Southern Philippines Peace Process (2009)
 International Contact Group on Venezuela (since 2019)

Literature
 I. Henneberg, 'International Contact Groups: Ad hoc coordination in international conflict management', in: South African Journal of International Affairs. Vol. 27, Nr. 4, 2020, p. 445-472. DOI: 10.1080/10220461.2020.1877190.
 M.P. Karns, ‘Ad Hoc Multilateral Diplomacy: The United States, the Contact Group, and Namibia,’in: International Organization 41, no. 1 (1987): 93–123
 C. Schwegmann,‘Modern Concert Diplomacy: The Contact Group and the G7/8 in Crisis Management,’ in: Guiding Global Order: G8 Governance in the Twentyfirst Century, ed. J.J. Kirton, J.P. Daniels, and A. Freytag (Ashgate, 2001), 93–121.
 K. Herbolzheimer and E. Leslie, Innovation in Mediation Support: The International Contact Group in Mindanao (2013).

References

 
International relations
Political science
Peace and conflict studies
Diplomatic umbrella groups